Jelawat is a suburb in Bachok district, Kelantan, Malaysia.

References

Towns in Kelantan